Thomas White Currie Sr. (January 23, 1879 – April 22, 1943) was an American pastor, college president, and college football coach. He served as the head football coach at Austin College in Sherman, Texas in 1907. After coaching and teaching at Austin College for a short time, he earned a master's degree in history from the University of Texas at Austin in 1911 and seminary training at Austin Presbyterian Theological Seminary, the latter of which he served as president from 1922 until his death in 1943.

Currie was born on January 23, 1879, in Durango, Texas, to David Mitchell and Ira Ione White Currie. He died on April 22, 1943, at a hospital in Temple, Texas, after suffering a paralytic stroke a week prior.

Head coaching record

References

External links
 

1879 births
1943 deaths
Heads of universities and colleges in the United States
Austin Kangaroos football coaches
Austin Kangaroos football players
University of Texas at Austin alumni
People from Falls County, Texas
Coaches of American football from Texas
Players of American football from Texas